Nikolay Igoryevich Olyunin (born 23 October 1991) is a Russian snowboarder who won a silver medal at the 2014 Winter Olympics.

World cup podiums

Race podiums
  1 win – (1 SBX)
  6 podiums – (6 SBX)

References

External links

 
 
 
 

1991 births
Living people
Sportspeople from Krasnoyarsk
Russian male snowboarders
Olympic snowboarders of Russia
Olympic silver medalists for Russia
Olympic medalists in snowboarding
Medalists at the 2014 Winter Olympics
Universiade medalists in snowboarding
Snowboarders at the 2014 Winter Olympics
Snowboarders at the 2018 Winter Olympics
Universiade gold medalists for Russia
Universiade silver medalists for Russia
Competitors at the 2013 Winter Universiade
Competitors at the 2015 Winter Universiade
21st-century Russian people